Viktor Nikolaevich Beletsky (1928 – late 1990s) was a Soviet diplomat and ambassador.

Beletsky defended a habilitation in historical sciences. He held the following positions:

1954–1958 – official of the Soviet Embassy to Austria
1958–1961 – official of the Ministry of Foreign Affairs
1961–1968 – official of the Soviet Embassy to East Germany
1969–1972 – official at the Ministry of Foreign Affairs
1972–1974 – official of the Soviet Embassy to East Germany
1974–1978 – official of the Soviet Embassy to Czechoslovakia
1978–1980 – deputy rector of the Diplomatic Academy of the Ministry of Foreign Affairs of the Russian Federation
1980–1982 – official of the Soviet Embassy to East Germany
1982–1985 – ambassador of the Soviet Union to the Netherlands

Beletsky was married to Rimma and had two stepsons, born ca. 2001 and 2013. His family disappeared in 2013 under unclear circumstances.

References

1928 births
Ambassadors of the Soviet Union to the Netherlands
1990s deaths